This is a list of electoral results for the electoral district of Robina in Queensland state elections.

Members for Robina

Election results

Elections in the 2000s

References

Queensland state electoral results by district